The Jessie Jack Hooper House is located in Oshkosh, Wisconsin.

History
Home of women's suffrage leader Jessie Jack Hooper. The house and matching coach house are Shingle style, designed by Waters and built in 1888. Her husband Benjamin was a lawyer for the sawmill. Jessie also organized women's war work during World War I, presided over the Wisconsin League of Women Voters in the 20s, and was involved in anti-war campaigns in the 30s.

The district was listed on the National Register of Historic Places in 1978 and on the State Register of Historic Places in 1989. It is located in the Algoma Boulevard Historic District.

References

Houses on the National Register of Historic Places in Wisconsin
National Register of Historic Places in Winnebago County, Wisconsin
Buildings and structures in Oshkosh, Wisconsin
Houses in Winnebago County, Wisconsin
Shingle Style architecture in Wisconsin
Houses completed in 1888